Captain Sir Lancelot Carrington Royle,  (31 May 1898 – 19 June 1978) was a British Olympian and businessman.

Royle was an Olympic athlete (Paris 1924), chairman and CEO of Allied Suppliers Ltd., Home and Colonial Stores Ltd., Lipton Ltd., NAAFI and one of Britain's leading 20th century retail businessmen.

Education 

Lancelot Royle was the son of Rev. Vernon Royle, the famous test cricketer, and grew up at Stanmore Park, north of London. He was educated at Harrow School and RMA Woolwich.

Early career 

Royle left Harrow in 1916 and was commissioned into the Royal Field Artillery and shipped out to France to fight in the First World War. He was to remain in the European theatre until the Armistice in 1918.

At the end of the war, Royle remained in the army, and was encouraged to develop his sporting prowess. He was a highly talented sprinter, competing regularly with the likes of Harold Abrahams and Eric Liddell for honours. He was British Army sprint Champion in 1920 and 1921, but resigned his commission as a lieutenant later the same year. In 1924, he represented Great Britain as part of the "Chariots of Fire" team in Paris. He won a silver medal in the 4 * 100 relay, in a team including Harold Abrahams. He was also a talented 200-meter sprinter, and it was he that gave up his spot to allow Eric Liddell to run the 200-metre race where Liddell won bronze.

Business career 

Royle began his business career with Unilever, joining Home and Colonial Stores in 1928. By the start of the Second World War, was regarded as one of the finest retail executives in the country. He rejoined the Royal Artillery, but was asked by the Prime Minister, Winston Churchill to be co-chairman of the Macharg/Royle Treasury Committee and then to take on the Chairmanship of NAAFI. He was to hold the Chairmanship for 12 years, during which time NAAFI developed into a global operation, serving British forces around the Empire. As chairman & CEO, he transformed Home and Colonial Stores into one of premier retail shopping destinations in the United Kingdom. He was invited to sit on the boards of British Match Corporation as deputy chairman, Wilkinson Sword, Bryant and May, Liebigs and Oxo among others. He was a Governor of Harrow School. He resigned his Royal Artillery commission as a captain in 1948.

He was made a Knight Commander of the Order of the British Empire (KBE) in 1944.

Family 

He married Barbara Haldin in 1922, they had 2 sons (Anthony Royle, later Baron Fanshawe of Richmond and Timothy Royle, founder of the Control Risks Group) and a daughter (Penelope Royle, now Oldham). He died in 1978 aged 80.

References 

1898 births
1978 deaths
People educated at Harrow School
English male sprinters
Graduates of the Royal Military Academy, Woolwich
British chief executives
Businesspeople awarded knighthoods
Royal Artillery officers
British Army personnel of World War I
British Army personnel of World War II
Knights Commander of the Order of the British Empire
Olympic athletes of Great Britain
Athletes (track and field) at the 1924 Summer Olympics
Olympic silver medallists for Great Britain
Medalists at the 1924 Summer Olympics
Olympic silver medalists in athletics (track and field)
20th-century English businesspeople